The Hugo Award for Best Novelette is one of the Hugo Awards given each year for science fiction or fantasy stories published or translated into English during the previous calendar year. The novelette award is available for works of fiction of between 7,500 and 17,500 words; awards are also given out in the short story, novella and novel categories. The Hugo Awards have been described as "a fine showcase for speculative fiction" and "the best known literary award for science fiction writing".

The Hugo Award for Best Novelette was first awarded in 1955, and was subsequently awarded in 1956, 1958, and 1959, lapsing in 1960. The category was reinstated for 1967 through 1969, before lapsing again in 1970; after returning in 1973, it has remained to date.  In addition to the regular Hugo awards, beginning in 1996 Retrospective Hugo Awards, or "Retro Hugos", have been available to be awarded for 50, 75, or 100 years prior. Retro Hugos may only be awarded for years after 1939 in which no awards were originally given. To date, Retro Hugo awards have been given for novelettes for 1939, 1941, 1943–1946, 1951, and 1954.

Hugo Award nominees and winners are chosen by supporting or attending members of the annual World Science Fiction Convention, or Worldcon, and the award presentation constitutes its central event. The selection process is defined in the World Science Fiction Society Constitution as instant-runoff voting with six nominees, except in the case of a tie. The novelettes on the ballot are the six most-nominated by members that year, with no limit on the number of stories that can be nominated. Initial nominations are made by members in January through March, while voting on the ballot of six nominations is performed roughly in April through July, subject to change depending on when that year's Worldcon is held. Prior to 2017, the final ballot was five works; it was changed that year to six, with each initial nominator limited to five nominations. Worldcons are generally held near the start of September, and are held in a different city around the world each year.

During the 65 nomination years, 202 authors have had works nominated; 50 of these have won, including coauthors and Retro Hugos. 1 translator has been noted along with the author whose work she translated. Poul Anderson, Isaac Asimov, and Harlan Ellison both have received the most Hugos for Best Novelette at three, with Ellison having been nominated a total of six times, while seven other authors have won twice. Mike Resnick has had the most nominations at eight, and Ursula K. Le Guin and Greg Egan have been nominated seven times each. Fifteen other authors have been nominated at least four times, while Egan has the most nominations without winning.

Winners and nominees 
In the following table, the years correspond to the date of the ceremony, rather than when the novelette was first published. Each year links to the corresponding "year in literature". Entries with a blue background have won the award; those with a white background are the nominees on the short-list. If the novelette was originally published in a book with other stories rather than by itself or in a magazine, the publisher's name is included after the book title.

  *   Winners and joint winners

Retro Hugos 
Beginning with the 1996 Worldcon, the World Science Fiction Society created the concept of "Retro Hugos", in which the Hugo award could be retroactively awarded for years 50, 75, or 100 years before the current year, if no awards were originally given that year. Retro Hugos have been awarded eight times, for 1939, 1941, 1943–1946, 1951, and 1954.

See also
 Nebula Award for Best Novelette
 List of joint winners of the Hugo and Nebula awards

Notes

References

External links
 Hugo Award official site
 List of Hugo Award nominees in Locus magazine

 
Novelette
Short story awards